St. Paul's Missionary College, located on Norton's Lane, Wantirna South, in Melbourne, Australia  is the formation house of the Missionary Society of St Paul in Australia. This venue is also used as a retreat site and spirituality centre. Augustine Grech was the first missionary to arrive in Australia, in 1948.

Seminaries and theological colleges in Australia
Catholic seminaries
Education in Melbourne
1948 establishments in Australia
Educational institutions established in 1948
Buildings and structures of the Catholic Church in Australia